Mulvane was an unincorporated community in Fayette County, West Virginia, united States.

The community most likely was named after the local Mulvane (or O'Mulvanny) family.

References 

Unincorporated communities in West Virginia
Unincorporated communities in Fayette County, West Virginia